Katti Batti is an Indian Hindi-language romantic comedy film directed by Nikkhil Advani and produced by Siddharth Roy Kapur under the banner of UTV Motion Pictures. The film stars Imran Khan and Kangana Ranaut in the lead roles. This marked the final film appearance of Imran Khan. The first look of the movie was revealed on 12 June 2015, and the trailer of the movie was released on 14 June 2015. The film was released on 18 September 2015.

Plot

Madhav "Maddy" Kabra (Imran Khan) is an architect who falls in love with Payal (Kangana Ranaut) during college. After college they begin a live-in relationship for 5 years until suddenly Payal leaves Maddy. While all his friends tell him to forget about Payal, Maddy crazily tries to find Payal and win her back, during which the story flashes back to what happened during their 5-year relationship.
Finally Maddy finds out that Payal is dying of cancer. Maddy and Payal patch up and live happily for 4 months until Payal dies in Maddy's arms, making him promise that he'll always keep this love alive in his heart and love again.

Cast
 Imran Khan as Madhav "Maddy" Kabra
 Kangana Ranaut as Payal 
 Vivan Bhatena as Rakesh "Ricky" Ahuja
 Mithila Palkar as Koyal Kabra: Maddy's sister
 Suparna Marwah as Madhav's mother
 Suhaas Ahuja as Roger
 Suneel Sinha as Mr. Kabra: Madhav's father
 Bugs Bhargava as Ramalingam: Madhav's boss
 Abhishek Saha as Vinay: Maddy's friend

Soundtrack

The soundtrack of Katti Batti was composed by Shankar–Ehsaan–Loy and the lyrics were written by Kumaar. The first song titled "Sarfira" was released on 12 August 2015. The music rights for the film were acquired by Zee Music Company. The full audio album was released on 27 August 2015.

Box office

India
On its fourth day the film collected  net. The film collected  net on its fifth day. The film collected  net in its first week worldwide.

Overseas
The film grossed an estimated  internationally within its first four days. By the end of its first week, the film had grossed approximately  internationally.

References

External links
 

2015 films
2010s Hindi-language films
Indian romantic comedy-drama films
2015 romantic comedy-drama films
UTV Motion Pictures films
Films directed by Nikkhil Advani
2015 comedy films
2015 drama films